Květa Peschke and Katarina Srebotnik were the defending champions but were defeated in the semifinals by Andrea Hlaváčková and Lucie Hradecká.

Hlaváčková and Hradecká went on to win the title, defeating Julia Görges and Flavia Pennetta in the final, 6–7(2–7), 6–2, [10–7].

Seeds

Draw

References 
 Main draw

2012 Doubles
ASB Classic - Doubles